Cricket Wireless Amphitheater may refer to:

Cricket Wireless Amphitheater (Bonner Springs, Kansas), later Providence Medical Center Amphitheater
Cricket Wireless Amphitheater (Phoenix, Arizona), later Desert Sky Pavilion and Ak-Chin Pavilion
Cricket Wireless Amphitheatre (Chula Vista, California), later Sleep Train Amphitheatre